The following events occurred in January 1903:

January 1, 1903 (Thursday)
King Edward VII of the United Kingdom is proclaimed Emperor of India, a title first established during the reign of his mother, Queen Victoria.

Konstantin Tsiolkovski's article, Explorations of outer space with the help of reaction apparatuses, is published, describing his Basic Rocket Equation. 
In the United States, Syracuse Athletic Club defeats Orange Athletic Club 36–0 at Madison Square Garden, to win the 1902–03 World Series of Football.

January 2, 1903 (Friday)
Born: Kane Tanaka, oldest living person in the world from 22 July 2018 to 19 April 2022.

January 3, 1903 (Saturday)
The Norwegian ship Remittant is towed into quarantine in Queenstown, Ireland, as a result of an outbreak of beriberi among the crew.

Died: Alois Hitler, 65, Austrian civil servant, father of Adolf Hitler (suspected pleural hemorrhage)

January 4, 1903 (Sunday)
Died:
Alexandr Aksakov, 70, Russian writer
Topsy, c. 28, female Asian elephant, killed by poisoning and electrocution at Luna Park, Coney Island, New York City. The Edison Manufacturing Company would release the film Electrocuting an Elephant, documenting Topsy's death, later in the month.

January 5, 1903 (Monday)
Died: Práxedes Mateo Sagasta, 77, Spanish politician, former Prime Minister (b. 1825)

January 6, 1903 (Tuesday)
Born: Maurice Abravanel, Greek conductor, in Thessaloniki (died 1993)

January 7, 1903 (Wednesday)
In Nevada, twelve striking members of the Miners' Union attack mine manager J. A. Traylor in his office. Traylor shoots and kills three of the miners and seriously wounds three others.
George Pardee is sworn in as Governor of California in Sacramento.
Born: Alan Napier, English actor, in King's Norton, Birmingham (died 1988)

January 8, 1903 (Thursday)

January 9, 1903 (Friday)
The Irish cargo ship SS Palmas is last sighted whilst on a voyage from Liverpool, England, to Boston, Massachusetts, United States. The vessel is never seen again and is presumed to have sunk in the Atlantic Ocean with the loss of all 39 crew.

January 10, 1903 (Saturday)
Born: Barbara Hepworth, English sculptor, in Wakefield (died 1975)

January 11, 1903 (Sunday)
Born: Alan Paton, South African author and anti-apartheid activist, in Pietermaritzburg (died 1988)

January 12, 1903 (Monday)
Born: Igor Kurchatov, Russian physicist, in Simsky Zavod (died 1960)
Born: Andrew J. Transue, American Congressman and attorney (Morissette v. United States) died 1995

January 13, 1903 (Tuesday)

January 14, 1903 (Wednesday)
The Hotel National, Moscow, designed by Alexander Ivanov and financed by The Varvarinskoe Joint-Stock Company of Householders, opens to customers.

January 15, 1903 (Thursday)
 On a street corner in Columbia, South Carolina, James H. Tillman, the Lieutenant Governor of South Carolina, shoots and mortally wounds newspaper editor Narciso Gener Gonzales, who will die on January 19. Tillman will be acquitted of Gonzales' murder on the grounds of self-defense on October 15, but the press will condemn the verdict, and Tillman will retire in disgrace from public life.

January 16, 1903 (Friday)
A powder explosion in an  gun turret aboard the battleship USS Massachusetts kills nine men.
Born:
Peter Brocco, American actor, in Reading, Pennsylvania (died 1992, heart attack)
William Grover-Williams, French racing driver and war hero, in Montrouge (executed by Nazi Germany, 1945)

January 17, 1903 (Saturday)
El Yunque National Forest in Puerto Rico becomes part of the United States National Forest System, as the Luquillo Forest Reserve.

January 18, 1903 (Sunday)

January 19, 1903 (Monday)
The first west–east transatlantic radio broadcast is made from the United States to England (the first east–west broadcast having been made in 1901).
Born: Boris Blacher, German composer and librettist, in Niutschuang (Newchwang), Fengtian, Qing Empire (died 1975)
Died: Narciso Gener Gonzales, 44, American journalist and newspaper editor (gunshot wound sustained on January 15)

January 20, 1903 (Tuesday)
In the New York election to the United States Senate, incumbent Republican Senator Thomas C. Platt is re-elected by the New York State Senate.

January 21, 1903 (Wednesday)
The American tugboat Leyden founders in heavy fog in the Atlantic Ocean off Block Island, Rhode Island, while returning from Puerto Rico.
Robert Reid is appointed to the Australian Senate for Victoria to replace the recently deceased Senator Sir Frederick Sargood.

January 22, 1903 (Thursday)
Born: Fritz Houtermans, Polish physicist (d. 1966)

January 23, 1903 (Friday)
Born: Jorge Eliécer Gaitán, Colombian politician, in Cucunubá or Manta (assassinated 1948)

January 24, 1903 (Saturday)

January 25, 1903 (Sunday)

January 26, 1903 (Monday)

January 27, 1903 (Tuesday)
Born: John Eccles, Australian neuropsychologist, recipient of the Nobel Prize in Physiology or Medicine, in Melbourne (died 1997)

January 28, 1903 (Wednesday)
Esmond Train Wreck: Fourteen people lose their lives when the Crescent City Express, bound for Benson, Arizona, United States, collides head-on with the Pacific Coast Express, bound for Tucson, Arizona. The accident was caused by a communication failure.
Died:
Augusta Holmès, 55, French composer (cardiac arrest)
Robert Planquette, 54, French composer

January 29, 1903 (Thursday)

January 30, 1903 (Friday)

January 31, 1903 (Saturday)
 An inaugural concert is held at the newly-opened Palais des Fêtes (then called "Sängerhaus") in Strasbourg - then in Germany, now in France.

References

1903
1903-01
1903-01